American singer Kelly Clarkson has recorded material for her nine studio albums. After signing a contract in 2002 with RCA Records, a division of then-Bertelsmann Music Group (now Sony Music), 20-year-old Clarkson released the double A-side single "Before Your Love" / "A Moment Like This" and began to record tracks for her debut studio album, Thankful (2003). Its lead single, "Miss Independent", received a nomination for a Grammy Award for Best Female Pop Vocal Performance in 2004. "Miss Independent" was followed by "Low" and "The Trouble With Love Is", which was featured as a single from the soundtrack of the film Love Actually. In 2004, Clarkson recorded the song "Breakaway", which was released as a single from the soundtrack of the film The Princess Diaries 2: Royal Engagement. The song's commercial success inspired Clarkson to name her second studio album Breakaway. The album won a Grammy Award for Best Pop Vocal Album in 2006, while its second single, "Since U Been Gone", won for Best Female Pop Vocal Performance. Subsequent singles, "Behind These Hazel Eyes" (2005), "Because of You" (2005), and "Walk Away" (2006), became successful hits. Clarkson's third studio album, My December, was released in 2007. The album became a subject of a dispute with then RCA Music Group chairman Clive Davis, who criticized the album and suggested that Clarkson reunite with her previous collaborators. "Never Again", the lead single from My December, became its only hit single. Succeeding releases from My December included "Sober", "One Minute", and "Don't Waste Your Time".

Clarkson released her fourth studio album, All I Ever Wanted, in 2009. The album received a nomination for a Grammy Award for Best Pop Vocal Album in 2010 and its first three singles, "My Life Would Suck Without You", "I Do Not Hook Up" and "Already Gone", became hits. The release of "Already Gone" was met with controversy due to its musical similarities with Beyoncé's "Halo" (2009); both were produced and co-written by OneRepublic lead singer Ryan Tedder. Subsequent releases from All I Ever Wanted included "All I Ever Wanted" (2010) and "Cry" (2010), which became less successful than its predecessors. In 2011, Clarkson released her fifth studio album, Stronger, which was preceded by its lead single "Mr. Know It All". In 2013, the album won a Grammy Award for Best Pop Vocal Album, while its second single, "Stronger (What Doesn't Kill You)" (2012), received three nominations, including Record of the Year and Song of the Year. "Dark Side" (2012) was released as the album's final single. In 2012, Clarkson recorded three songs for her first greatest hits album, Greatest Hits – Chapter One: "Catch My Breath", "Don't Rush" and "People Like Us" (2013), all of which were released as singles. She released her sixth studio album Wrapped in Red in 2013, a Christmas album containing eleven cover versions of Christmas standards and five original songs, two of which—"Underneath the Tree" and "Wrapped in Red" (2014) were issued as singles. Wrapped in Red was followed by her seventh studio album Piece by Piece in 2015, which had the singles "Heartbeat Song", "Invincible" and "Piece by Piece" (2016). Meaning of Life, her first studio album under Atlantic Records, was released in 2017 and included the singles "Love So Soft", "I Don't Think About You", and "Heat". When Christmas Comes Around..., her second album released under Atlantic Records following Meaning of Life, and second Christmas album following Wrapped In Red, and ninth studio album overall was released in 2021.

Songs

References

Notes 

 "Before Your Love" and "A Moment Like This" were released as a double A-side single in 2002; a new mix of the songs were included in Thankful in 2003.
 "Get Up (A Cowboys Anthem)", "Go", "Tie It Up", "Up to the Mountain", "This is for My Girls", "River Rose's Magical Lullaby", "Christmas Eve", "I've Love You Since Forever" and "I Dream in Southern" were originally released as non-album singles and tracks.
 Clarkson provided background vocals on "Trying to Help You Out" and "Pray for Peace"; her name was not credited on the tracks.
 "Just for Now" contains a portion of the composition "Carol of the Bells", written by Peter J. Wilhousky.
 Clarkson appears as part of the UglyDolls cast.
 A "Movie Version" with the UglyDolls cast was released simultaneously with a "Pop Version", which only features Clarkson.
 Clarkson appears as part of the Trolls World Tour cast.

Citations

Further information

External links 
 

 
Clarkson, Kelly